William Henry Stiles (January 1, 1808 – December 20, 1865) was a United States Representative and lawyer from Georgia. He was the grandson of Joseph Clay.

Biography
Born in Savannah, Georgia, in 1808, Stiles attended high school at the Hopkins School in New Haven, Connecticut. After graduating from Hopkins, Stiles studied law at Yale College, gained admittance to the state bar in 1831 and practiced law in Savannah. He served as the solicitor general for Georgia's eastern district from 1833 to 1836.  In 1842, Stiles was elected as a Democratic Representative from Georgia to the 28th United States Congress and served one term from March 4, 1843, until March 3, 1845.

On April 19, 1845,  Stiles was appointed by U.S. President James Polk as chargé d'affaires to the Austrian Empire, a position which he held until October 1849.  He then returned to his beloved Etowah Cliffs in Cass County where he had a plantation, and lived with his wife Eliza Anne MacKay Stiles, and his children: Mary Cowper Stiles, William Henry Stiles Jr., and Robert MacKay Stiles, and was elected to the Georgia House of Representatives in 1858 and served as that body's speaker of the house.

Stiles served as one of Georgia's at-large delegates to the commercial congress in Montgomery, Alabama, in 1858. Also in 1858 he delivered an address, Southern Education for Southern Youth, to the Cherokee Baptist College.  He also was a delegate to the 1860 Democratic National Convention.  During the American Civil War, Stiles served as a colonel in the Confederate States Army. He died in Savannah on December 20, 1865, and was buried in Laurel Grove Cemetery in that same city.

References

External links

Stuart A. Rose Manuscript, Archives, and Rare Book Library, Emory University: William H. Stiles papers, 1749-1892

1808 births
1865 deaths
Politicians from Savannah, Georgia
Democratic Party members of the United States House of Representatives from Georgia (U.S. state)
Ambassadors of the United States to Austria
19th-century American diplomats
Democratic Party members of the Georgia House of Representatives
Georgia (U.S. state) lawyers
American slave owners
Confederate States Army officers
19th-century American politicians
19th-century American lawyers